The Medal for Fighters Against Fascism was an award of the German Democratic Republic given to people who had been active in the German Resistance against Nazism.

Institution and specifics of the award 
The award was instituted on 22 February 1958 by the Council of Ministers and honoured those who had been involved in the resistance against the Nazi regime; for example, those confined to prisons or concentration camps or sentenced to hard labour, political émigrés, and also members of the International Brigades. Anti-Fascist activity in the National Committee for a Free Germany was also recognised, as in the case of Arno von Lenski (in 1940 made an honorary member of the Volksgerichtshof, later a Major General in the National People's Army of the GDR).

The medal could be awarded only once and only to individuals. It was presented by the Chairman of the Council of Ministers and was accompanied by a certificate. Beginning in 1964, all holders of the award received an honorarium of 600 marks.

Description 
The silver medal, 32 mm in diameter, depicts on the obverse profiles of Rudolf Breitscheid (rear) and Ernst Thälmann (front), looking to the left from the point of view of the observer and encircled in the upper half by the inscription  (fighter against Fascism). On the reverse, the arms of the GDR are enclosed by the inscription  (forwards and forget not - top) and the years  (bottom). 

The medal was worn on the left upper breast on a rectangular clip with red ribbon, initially 28 mm wide, beginning in 1959 reduced to 24 mm. A black, red and gold vertical bar 7.5 mm high was woven into the ribbon. The corresponding ribbon bar was of the same design.

Notable recipients (partial list)  

 1958: Hermann Axen
 1958: Martin Burkhardt
 1958: Käthe Dahlem
 1958: Arno von Lenski 
 1958: Peter Florin
 1958: Paul Fröhlich
 1958: Walter Hähnel
 1958: Greta Kuckhoff
 1958: Charlotte Küter
 1958: Paul Lewitt
 1958: Arthur Lieberasch
 1958: Paul Meuter
 1958: Karl Raddatz
 1958: Heinrich Rau
 1958: Elfriede Paul
 1958: Paul Schwertz
 1965: Aleksander Kulisiewicz
 1967: Edith Braemer, Professor of Modern and Contemporary Literature, University of Leipzig
 1971: Doris Wetterhahn
 unknown year: Hedwig Voegt (1903–1988)
 unknown year: Ferdinand Jung (1905–1973)

References

External links 
 Further information

Orders, decorations, and medals of East Germany
Awards established in 1958
1958 establishments in East Germany